Kristen Connolly (born July 12, 1980) is an American actress. She is known for her roles as Dana in the 2011 film The Cabin in the Woods, Christina Gallagher on the Netflix series House of Cards and Jamie Campbell on the CBS series Zoo.

Career
Connolly began her career with recurring roles on several CollegeHumor digital shorts. She appeared as an extra on the films Mona Lisa Smile, Meet Dave, and The Happening. She has also appeared on two CBS daytime soap operas with recurring roles on Guiding Light and As the World Turns.

She first gained mainstream recognition in 2012, after starring as the main protagonist Dana in the Joss Whedon/Drew Goddard film The Cabin in the Woods. She also starred in the horror film The Bay. In 2013, she had a starring role as Christina Gallagher on the Netflix series House of Cards. On September 1, 2014 the A&E Houdini miniseries premiered with 3.7 million viewers, Connolly plays Bess Houdini with Academy Award-winning Adrien Brody playing Harry Houdini. Connolly also portrayed Jamie, a passionate journalist in the CBS drama-thriller series Zoo and co-starred as Lena in the drama series The Whispers. In 2014 she portrayed Petra Anderson in the drama thriller film A Good Marriage, based on Stephen King's short story of the same name.

Personal life
Connolly is a native of Montclair, New Jersey. She is married to Stephen O'Reilly with whom she has two children.

Filmography

Film

Television

References

External links

1980 births
Living people
21st-century American actresses
Actresses from New Jersey
American film actresses
American soap opera actresses
American television actresses
Middlebury College alumni
People from Montclair, New Jersey